Rangasamy Velu (born 25 July 1940), is an Indian politician of the Pattali Makkal Katchi (PMK) party. He has been elected to 14th Lok Sabha as Union Minister of State, Railways from Arakkonam Lok Sabha constituency of Tamil Nadu from 2004 to 2009. He started his political career as Officer of Indian Administrative Service and worked as Additional Registrar, Cooperative Societies; also served as member, Tamil Nadu Public Service Commission. He also worked as District Collector; Director of Municipal Administration and Joint Commissioner, Revenue Administration.
He has a PhD in disaster management, he also has a bachelor of Law degree and master of business administration degree.
 He was educated in the Voorhees college Vellore, Madras Law College, Madras University and Madras Christian College and was a resident of Bishop Heber Hall. He has published his autobiography in Tamil named ‘en vazhkai payanam’. He is from Vanniyar community.

Current life
Shri Velu now is a retired IAS officer. He is still active in politics in the PMK.

References

Living people
Indian Tamil people
Lok Sabha members from Tamil Nadu
1940 births
India MPs 2004–2009
Union ministers of state of India
Pattali Makkal Katchi politicians
Union Ministers from Tamil Nadu
National Democratic Alliance candidates in the 2014 Indian general election